Wayne Lewis may refer to:

 Wayne Lewis (bowls) (born 1951/1952), Australian Paralympic lawn bowler
 Wayne Lewis (cricketer) (born 1962), Jamaican cricketer
 Wayne D. Lewis Jr., American academic administrator